Andrea Gasbarroni  (born 6 August 1981) is an Italian former professional footballer who played as a midfielder.

Club career

Juventus
An attacking midfielder who can also play occasionally as a winger or second striker, Gasbarroni started his career at Juventus F.C. youth team, but after graduate from Primavera team, he was loaned to Varese, later sold to Sampdoria in joint-ownership bid. In summer 2003, he was transferred to Palermo in another co-ownership deal for about €1.3 million and bought back in June 2006 for an undisclosed fee.

Parma
After Marco Marchionni joined Juventus on a free transfer, Gasbarroni joined Parma on loan.

He was sold to Parma F.C. outright for €1.5 million in 2007.

Genoa
Genoa signed Gasbarroni in July 2008, for €2 million, as well as half of the card of Magnus Troest for €1.5 million, with Julio César de León joined Parma for €2.9 million and Alessandro Lucarelli for €1.2 million.

Torino
On 2 February 2009, Torino F.C. engaged the offensive wing in a co-ownership deal from Genoa, for €500,000. The move became permanent in June 2009 after Genoa declined to make an offer to buy back the remaining half of the player's registration rights.

Monza
On 23 January 2015, Gasbarroni was released by Monza.

International career
Gasbarroni was in the Italian Olympic squad that won the bronze medal at the 2004 Summer Olympics football tournament.

Honours
Orders
 5th Class / Knight: Cavaliere Ordine al Merito della Repubblica Italiana: 2004

References

External links
 
 
 
 
 
 National Team stats  
 
 

1981 births
Living people
Footballers from Turin
Italian footballers
Association football midfielders
Juventus F.C. players
S.S.D. Varese Calcio players
U.C. Sampdoria players
Palermo F.C. players
Parma Calcio 1913 players
Genoa C.F.C. players
Torino F.C. players
A.C. Monza players
A.S. Giana Erminio players
Pinerolo F.C. players
A.C. Bra players
Serie A players
Serie B players
Serie C players
Serie D players
Italy under-21 international footballers
Olympic footballers of Italy
Footballers at the 2004 Summer Olympics
Medalists at the 2004 Summer Olympics
Olympic medalists in football
Olympic bronze medalists for Italy
Knights of the Order of Merit of the Italian Republic